Anna-Lena Stolze (born 8 July 2000) is a German footballer. She plays as a striker for FC Twente in the Eredivisie.

She was a member of the German Under-17 national team that won the 2016 U-17 European Championship in Belarus.

Career
Stolze made her competitive debut for VfL Wolfsburg as a second-half substitute in a 2017–18 UEFA Women's Champions League quarterfinal match against SK Slavia Prague. He made her Frauen-Bundesliga against champions FC Bayern Munich in May 2018.

Honours
VfL Wolfsburg
Frauen-Bundesliga (1): 2019-20,
DFB-Pokal (1): 2019-20,

FC Twente
Eredivisie (2): 2020-21, 2021-22,

Germany
UEFA Women's Under-17 Championship (1): 2016,

References

External links
Profile at the German Football Federation

2000 births
Living people
Sportspeople from Lübeck
FC Twente (women) players
VfL Wolfsburg (women) players
Frauen-Bundesliga players
German women's footballers
German expatriate women's footballers
Germany women's youth international footballers
Women's association football forwards
Expatriate women's footballers in the Netherlands